A Darkness More Than Night is the tenth novel by American crime author Michael Connelly; it is the seventh featuring the Los Angeles detective Hieronymus "Harry" Bosch, and the second featuring FBI profiler Terry McCaleb, with reporter Jack McEvoy (The Poet) also making an appearance in a supporting role.

Plot summary
Terry McCaleb and Graciela Rivers have married and have an infant daughter named Cielo, and McCaleb's fishing charter business is running full-time on Catalina Island.  Nevertheless, sheriff's deputy Jaye Winston brings McCaleb a file involving the ritualistic murder of a suspect named Edward Gunn, and asks McCaleb to take a look at it, as the police have gotten nowhere.  As McCaleb analyzes the clues, they seem to point straight toward Harry Bosch, whom McCaleb knows from a previous investigation before his retirement.  Bosch is currently a key witness in a separate high-profile murder case involving movie director David Storey, who is on trial for murdering an actress during rough sex and staging her death to look like autoerotic asphyxiation. Author/reporter Jack McEvoy, who wrote The Poet, is covering the case.

After McCaleb alerts the police to Bosch's probable involvement in the murder, Bosch goes to Catalina himself to challenge McCaleb's work and to ask him to re-examine the evidence.  Based on a parking ticket that McCaleb finds, he concludes that Bosch may have been set up by Storey in order to discredit his evidence in the court case, but the key evidence in proving that is a post office surveillance tape that was in the process of being erased, and from which nothing usable can be recovered.

Nevertheless, Bosch and McCaleb pretend that they have recovered something from the tape. This prompts Rudy Tafero, Gunn's actual killer and an ex-cop who handled security for Storey, to target and almost kills McCaleb.  Bosch saves McCaleb and captures Rudy, while in the process killing Rudy's younger brother Jesse.  In return for not being charged with felony-murder in his brother's death, Rudy turns over evidence implicating Storey in the frame of Bosch, and Storey agrees to plead guilty to murder in a plea bargain seen by only McEvoy (who got a tip from Bosch) among the reporters.  However, McCaleb realizes that Bosch was around to save him only because Bosch knew all the details of the potential frame, which Bosch had lied about to McCaleb, and McCaleb breaks off any renewed relationship with Bosch as a result.  Bosch then "baptizes" himself in a plan for a fresh start.

TV adaptation
The events of A Darkness More Than Night were adapted for the third season of Bosch. McCaleb's role as the unofficial investigator of Gunn's murder is filled instead by Jerry Edgar, who is piggy-backing on the official investigation being carried out by LAPD Detectives Jimmy Robertson and Rondell Pierce. Less significantly, David Storey's name is changed to Andrew Holland, while prosecutor Janis Langweiser becomes Deputy District Attorney Anita Benitez, whom Bosch is dating. The resolution to the story is changed, as Rudy Tafero flips on Holland after the police arrest Jesse due to Bosch leaking footage from an illegal spy-camera of his showing Jesse breaking into Gunn's apartment, and agrees to wear a wire to get Holland to incriminate himself. Edgar realizes the truth about Bosch having witnessed Gunn's murder after Bosch mentions during his interrogation of Rudy the specific model of car that the Taferos drove to the scene of the murder before Rudy mentioned it, and it is not visible within the spy-camera's viewing area.

Awards
The novel was nominated for the 2002 Barry Award for "Best Novel".

References

Harry Bosch series
2000 American novels
Novels set in Los Angeles
Little, Brown and Company books